Banhadoa luculenta is a species of moth of the family Tortricidae. It is found in Paraná, Brazil.

References

Moths described in 1983
Cochylini
Taxa named by Józef Razowski
Moths of South America